Alex Mockford (born 3 May 1981, in England) is a former English rugby union player who played for Glasgow Warriors, Harlequins, Bristol and Pau at the  Number Eight position.

Amateur career

Mockford started with Sutton and Epsom.

He played with Esher from 2006 to 2008. He later played for Sutton and Epsom again.

Professional career

He started with Harlequins in 1999. He stayed with them until 2003.

Mockford played with Pau in 2003-04. He played 4 matches in the European Challenge Cup for the French side.

Mockford had a trial with Glasgow Warriors in the 2004–05 season. He played a pre-season friendly against Sale Sharks. However during the match Mockford suffered a knee injury which ultimately put paid to his Glasgow ambitions.

The injury, of a cruciate ligament, keep him sidelined from rugby for 10 months. After this lay-off he was taken on by Bristol.

International career

Mockford played for England at Under 18 and Under 19 level and for England Students.

Rugby League

In 2006 he played a couple of trial matches for Wakefield Trinity Wildcats.

Outside rugby

Mockford has now built a career in marketing for the gambling industry.

External links 

Statbunker profile
Two Players On Trial With Glasgow - SRU
Alex Mockford profile

References 

1981 births
Living people
Glasgow Warriors players
Bristol Bears players
Harlequin F.C. players
Esher RFC players